Soochow University School of Law is one of the oldest law schools in Taiwan. It is part of Soochow University.  It enjoyed the high reputation of "Chaoyang in the North, Soo Chow in the South" amongst Chinese law schools. It is dedicated to legal professional education, National law and Anglo-American law. This is the first comparative law school in Asia, and actively cultivates comparative law and the international law professionals.

History
Soochow University was founded in 1900 at Soo Chow (now Suzhou), mainland China. The Comparative Law School of the university, as the first modern law school in China, was later founded in 1915 in Shanghai Kunshan Road, starting with the law department. In 1927 it changed its name to the law school and started dedicating to education of professional law. Its curriculum adopts both national and common law, and it positively cultivates talents in comparative law and international law. It is the only college in China that teaches Anglo-American law in a systematic way outside of Chinese law. One of the most famous law schools in China, the first comparative law school in Asia, is known as one of the best comparative law schools in the world, and it contributes to the training of talents in comparative law and international law. From the 1930s to the 1990s, the International Court of Justice had a total of six Chinese judges. Starting from Gu Weijun, and until 1997, Li Haopei, a judge of the United Nations International Criminal Tribunal for the former Yugoslavia, was a professor or graduate of Soochow Law School.Soochow University School of Law provided modern legal training prior to the middle of the 20th century in Asia. During the Chinese Civil War, the university was forced to limit its operation along with many other academic institutes. The School of Law was the first school to be reinstated after the university was officially relocated to Taiwan in 1954. In 1969, the Ministry of Education approved the restoration of a complete university system, which is a "private Soochow University" with a liberal arts, law, and business college. After the restoration in Taiwan, it continued its rigorous tradition and hired good professors. To cultivate modern legal professionals with an international outlook, it diversify its curriculum like exchange aboard, and lots of speeches of international law, and especially the whole year's lecture of international law and so on. The purpose of all these systems' establishment is to improve the quality of legal professional education. In 1972 the School of Law moved into a new seven-story, air-conditioned building in downtown Taipei. These quarters are shared with the Graduate School of Economics and the School of Commerce. The building is strategically located near the Presidential Office and the judicial and legislative government complex.

In 2015, the School of Law is holding a year-long centennial celebration, making it one of the oldest law schools in Taiwan.

Department of law  
.In 1954, the Soochow University School of Law was re-established in Taiwan with a Department of Law. Then in 1971, the Institute of Law was formally established, and the former UN Secretary of the Law, Liang Shuli, was appointed as the first director in the same year, the Faculty of Law of the University Department was divided into two groups, the Judicial Practice Group and the Comparative Law Group. In order to meet the needs of the society, the Department of Nighttime was also established to train young people in the same year. In the 81st academic year, the Judicial Implementation Team and the Comparative Law Group were abolished, and the original system was restored. The group system was changed. It was divided into the Public Law Group, the Civil and Commercial Law Group and the International Law Group in the third year of the university for students to take elective courses. , with the development of its diverse career. In 1992, the university department canceled the group course and responded to the non-group enrollment system.

Legacy of Pedagogy 
When the Law School of Soochow University was established, the normal course was 3 hours, from 4:30 pm to 7:30 pm a day, Monday to Friday every week.  On the one hand, for the sake of the convenience of the part-time layers and judges, on the other hand, students can do part-time jobs to support themselves during the day. In order to make sure the student have completely appreciated the main legal regime and basic theory in the world, and to cultivate a valuable and valued generation who can make significant contributions for China in this field, the school decided to set up the course of 3 main legal system: The Common Law, the Anglo-America Law and the Chinese law at the same time; meanwhile, students can compare differences among the three legal system and further learn to use different law systems in every case or policy. Through this way, students have more strengths in the internationalized world than any other law school's students, and can change their thinking modes easily.

During 1920 though 1927, most course were taught in English, only few of courses which related to Chinese law system were taught in Chinese. In the early age after law school established, what student trained was the traditional Chinese teaching method——reading and reciting, but after 1923, the school began to exercise authentic case teaching method, instead of previous method to coordinate with Anglo-American law.
In order to fully promote the internationalization and diversification of legal research, the Continental Legal Data Center, the International Aviation and Space Law Data Center, and the Law of the Sea Data Center were established in 1994 and 1995. Legal academic and practical seminars have been held since 1992 on topics such as the comparison of legal systems across the Taiwan Straits, international financial law, international aviation and space law, civil and commercial financial and economic law, constitutional administrative law, criminal law, and customary laws of ethnic minorities. Jurisprudential journals and thesis collections, which contain Chinese and English legal academic papers that have passed the examination, have become a model for academic advancement.

In response to the diversified development of society and the need for legal professionals, training is no longer limited to traditional legal education. The increasing international interaction and the diversity of social development has not only improved the legal system as well as the economic development of the country, nowadays, people need more than just law officers and lawyers, they also need all sorts of legal services. The department of Law provides various professional courses including Business Law, Public Law, Criminal Law, Anglo-American Law, International Law, Financial Law, Fundamental Law and other related topics. The courses emphasize both Civil Law and Anglo-American Law, providing students with a dynamic learning environment and an abundant education to enhance students’ competitiveness.

Curriculum
Soochow law school provides students with multiple and international courses. During the five-year law school life, students are required to accomplish compulsory  courses of 135 credits and elective courses of 34 credits. Unlike other law schools in Taiwan concentrating on domestic legal teaching, Soochow Law School adheres to its teaching history which regards civil law and common law teaching as equally important. In the compulsory courses of 135 credits, common law courses such as Introduction to American Legal system(4 Credits, for Freshman), Torts(6 Credits, for Sophomore), Contracts(6 Credits, for Junior), Criminal law(4 Credits, for Senior) and Constitutional law(4 Credits, for Senior) have taken up 28 credits, making itself well-known not in Taiwan only, but also in Mainland China, even in Asia.

Law School's Second Speciality 
The total credit is 20, and the compulsory subjects are civil law (three credits), criminal law (three credits), and the Constitution of the Republic of China (two credits). Elective subjects include six subjects: Financial legal capacity:negotiable law (two credits), enforcement law (two credits), Business and general administrative skills:introduction to law (two credits), administrative law (two credits), Diplomatic and consular competence:public international law (two credits), and private international law (two credits). Elective credits are required for at least two subjects. If student have accumulated 12 credits, student can get the second specialty qualification.

Master Degree Program
The master's degree program of Soochow University School of Law has attracted students every year for admission. The program has divided into seven fields for students to pursue their legal studies, including Public Law, Criminal Law, Civil and Commercial Law, International Law, Economic and Financial law, Fiscal and Tax law, and Science and Technology Law. In 2001, Soochow University school of law initiated “In-service Master Program of Law”. The class is only open to those who is in fields other than law and with at least three years of working experiences. After graduating with a master's degree, students not only have their original profession, but also have legal professional knowledge, which will enable them to have more job opportunities.

Faculty and Alumni
Recognized for a strong faculty and staff with academic background in both civil law and common law systems, the School recruits full-time professors and alumni graduating from world famous law schools, such as Renmin University of China, Harvard Law School, UC Berkeley law school, U of Pennsylvania law school, U of VIrginia school of law, Duke law school, Michigan law school, Munchen University, Osaka University, the majority of them have received advanced law degrees such as LL.M., JD, SJD(JSD) and Phd.  Benefited for its reputation and location, today, its alumni in the legal profession include Justices of the Constitutional Court, the Prosecutor General of the Supreme Prosecutor Office, the CEO (managing partner) of the biggest law firm in Taiwan, the government and academia.

Downtown Taipei Campus

The Centennial Statue of Goddess
“As the statue unveils and the exhibition of the school’s history kick-starts, it symbolizes the legacy that we inherit and will pass down,” the dean of Soochow University School of Law, Chia-Yin Huang said, “unlike the blindfolded goddess Justitia of Western culture, portrayed with a law book and a sword in her hands, the statue here holds two spheres and has Eastern facial traits. It not only demonstrates the distinctive features of Soochow, but also manifests justice and innovation. Meanwhile, it gifts the School of Law with the meaning of heritage, and we hope the next century to come would be much more blessed.”

Jessup Moot Court Regional Winning Records
The Jessup Moot Court Team of Soochow University School of Law has won ten regional championships and represented Taiwan in the International Round since 1999.

The Law School and Pop Culture
The Electronic marquee situated at the first floor of Soochow University law school is also an attractive feature. The interesting scrolling text often changes with time and combine current events with encouragements to students, for instance, "The FIFA world cup is Brazil's, however, the final exam is yours". Therefore, it is usual to see students stop to watch the scrolling text with a big smile on their faces.

Nominated Alumni 
Soochow University School of Law has been home to many notable alumni :

 Fang, wen-zhang (方文長)
 Wu, ying-jhao (吳英昭)
 Yang, zhen (楊　楨)
 Huang, wen-luan (黃文圝)
 Wang, jung-chou (王榮周)
 Shuo, yi-ren (帥以仁)
 Hsu, yuan-guo (許淵國)
 Zheng, wen-lung (鄭文龍)

References

Soochow University (Taiwan)
Law schools in the Republic of China